Juvenile plantar dermatosis  is a condition usually seen in children between the ages of 3 and 14, and involves the cracking and peeling of weight bearing areas of the soles of the feet. One of the earliest descriptions was made by British dermatologist Darrell Wilkinson.

See also 
 Sulzberger–Garbe syndrome
 List of cutaneous conditions

References

External links 

Eczema